Yên Bái station is a railway station in Vietnam. It serves the town of Yên Bái, in Yên Bái Province.

References

Buildings and structures in Yên Bái province
Railway stations in Vietnam